The 1841 Vermont gubernatorial election was held on September 7, 1841.

Incumbent Whig Governor Silas H. Jennison did not run for re-election.

Whig nominee Charles Paine defeated Democratic nominee Nathan Smilie and Liberty nominee Titus Hutchinson.

Since no candidate received a majority in the popular vote, Paine was elected by the Vermont General Assembly per the state constitution.

General election

Candidates
Titus Hutchinson, Liberty, former Chief Judge of the Vermont Supreme Court. Hutchinson was nominated in place of Charles K. Williams, who declined the nomination.
Charles Paine, Whig, former member of the Vermont House of Representatives, Whig candidate for Governor in 1835
Nathan Smilie, Democratic, businessman, former member of the Vermont General Assembly, Democratic candidate for Governor in 1839

Results

Legislative election
As no candidate received a majority of the vote, the Vermont General Assembly was required to decide the election, both Houses meeting jointly choosing among the top three vote-getters, Paine, Smilie and Hutchinson. The legislative election was held on October 15, 1841.

Of the four scattering votes, one was cast for William A. Griswold (Whig) and one for Asa G. Hewes, while two were blanks. These votes were not counted.

Notes

References

1841
Vermont
Gubernatorial